Jakobe Mansztajn (born February 10, 1982, in Gdańsk) is a Polish poet and blogger.

Life and career

He studied psychology at the University of Gdańsk. He works as deputy editor of the literary quarterly Korespondencja z ojcem. He is the author of the poetry collection Vienna High Life (2009) for which he has received many awards, including the prestigious 2010 Wroclaw Silesius Poetry Award in the Best Debut category, the 2010 Sztorm Roku Award founded by Gazeta Wyborcza, and has also been nominated for the Gdynia Literary Prize. He was one of the initiators of the Zjednoczenie czytelnicze social campaign aimed at promoting reading books in Poland. His debut collection has been described as "one of the most distinctive in the past years in Polish literature" and gained wide critical acclaim. His works have been translated into many languages including German, Hebrew, English, Belarusian, and Norwegian.

He is a co-host of the satirical Internet TV programme Make Poland Great Again.

Works 
Poetry:
 Vienna High Life, Olsztyn, 2009 
 Studium przypadku, Poznań, 2014
Anthologies:
Six Poets: Twenty-eight Poems, Biblioteka Toposu, Sopot, 2011
Free over Blood, Zeszyty Poetyckie/OFF Press, London, 2011
Pociąg do poezji. Antologia wierszy współczesnych z motywem podróży, Kutnowski Dom Kultury, Kutno, 2011
Narracje. 6 opowiadań o Gdańsku, Biuro Gdańsk i Metropolia Europejska Stolica Kultury, Gdańsk, 2011
Zebrało się śliny, Biuro Literackie, Wrocław, 2016
Other publications:
Make Life Harder, Prószyński i S-ka, Warsaw, 2015 
Make Life Harder. Przewodnik po polityce i nie tylko, ale też, Prószyński i S-ka, Warsaw, 2016

See also
List of Polish-language poets
Polish literature

References

External links 
 Official website

Polish poets
1982 births
Writers from Gdańsk
Living people